The Ebelyakh Bay or Ebelyakhskaya Bay (Ebelyakhskaya Guba) is a bay in the Laptev Sea. It is located in Ust-Yansky District, Sakha Republic, Russian Federation.

Geography
The bay lies east of the Yana Bay region and southwest of the Laptev Strait. It is 36 km in width and wide open to the northwest. It is limited in the north by Cape Svyatoy Nos, a prominent headland.

This bay is in a vast region of wetlands. Lake Bustakh, the largest lake in the neighboring area, lies 37 km inland from the shores of the bay. Owing to its northerly location the Ebelyakh Bay is covered with ice most of the year.

References

External links
Satellite View

Bays of the Sakha Republic
Bays of the Laptev Sea
East Siberian Lowland